Sindhi is a language broadly spoken by the people of the historical Sindh region in the Indo subcontinent. Modern Sindhi is written in an extended Perso-Arabic script in Sindh province of Pakistan and (formally) in extended-Devanagari by Sindhis in partitioned India. Historically, Sindhi was written in various forms of Landa scripts and various other Indic scripts.

Sindhi Transliteration is essential to convert between Arabic and Devanagari so that speakers of both the countries can read the text of each other. In modern day, Sindhi script colloquially just refers to the Perso-Arabic script since majority of Sindhis are from Pakistan. It is also important to note that the Sindhi script is not same as the Urdu-Shahmukhi script, hence one cannot use script conversions like Hindi-Urdu Transliteration.

Technically, a direct one-to-one mapping or rule-based script conversion is not possible between Pakistani and Indian Sindhi, majorly since Devanagari is an abugida script and Arabic-Sindhi is an abjad script, and also other constraints like multiple similar characters from Perso-Arabic which map onto a single character in Devanagari. Hence it is preferred to use dictionary-based or machine learning-based transliteration between the Sindhi scripts. For colloquial usage in the digital space where writing Sindhi in Latin script is prevalent, Romanisation of Sindhi is used.

In addition to Sindhi, there have been attempts to design Indo-Pakistani transliteration systems for digraphic languages like Punjabi (written in Gurmukhi in East Punjab and Shahmukhi in West Punjab), Saraiki (written in an extended-Shahmukhi script in Saraikistan and unofficially in Sindhi-Devanagari script in India) and Kashmiri (written in extended Perso-Arabic by Kashmiri Muslims and extended-Devanagari by Kashmiri Hindus).

Consonants 

The following table provides an approximate one-to-one mapping for modern Sindhi consonants, especially for computational purposes (lossless script conversion). Note that this direct script conversion will not yield correct spellings, but rather a readable text for both the readers.

Single-letter Word Ligatures

Numerals

Punctuations & Symbols

Web Application for Sindhi Translitration 
This Program is about auto Translitration of Sindhi script into asian Languages . with Artificial Intelligence features, actually transliteration programs may be on bases like letter based transliteration in which multiple alternates of any letter in second languages die and one remains..... some are word base transliterations in which as more as half million words should be first vowel-led and then would be written an other language, this is also time taken work. now this is A I time so this program called sindhi transliteration is one click solution to all multiple alternate letters.... for example some one writes <khokhar khoraka khae tho> the program wil transliterate it as accurate as کوکر خوراڪ کائي ٿو. sindhi has three vowels which also are used as consonants like ا، و، ي    for example alif has two sounds like in ada ادا has two sounds one is of alif and an other is vowel of aa. and also if some one write سنڌ without zer zabar and peshu the program will convert it with vowels like <sindh>.

Sindhi Transliteration سنڌي ٽرانسلٽريشن

References 

Sindhi language
Transliteration